Peltopleurus is an extinct genus of bony fish. Two species are currently recognised as valid: Peltopleurus lissocephalus and Peltopleurus tyrannos.

See also

 Prehistoric fish
 List of prehistoric bony fish

References

Peltopleuriformes